This is a list of mobile phones with open-source operating systems.

Scope of the list

Cellular modem and other firmware

Some hardware components used in phones require drivers (or firmware) to run. For many components, only proprietary drivers are available (open source phones usually seek components with open drivers.) If firmware is not updatable and does not have control over any other part of the phone, it might be considered equivalent to part of the hardware. However, these conditions do not hold for cellular modems.

, all available mobile phones have a proprietary baseband chip (GSM module, cellular modem), except for the Necuno, which has no such chip and communicates by peer-to-peer VOIP. The modem is usually integrated with the system-on-a-chip and the memory. This presents security concerns; baseband attacks can read and alter data on the phone remotely.

The Librem 5 mobile segregates the modem from the system and memory, making it a separate module, a configuration rare in modern cellphones. There is an open-source baseband project, OsmocomBB.

Operating system: middleware and user interface

Generally, the phones included on this list contain copyleft software other than the Linux kernel, and minimal closed-source component drivers (see section above).
Android-based devices do not appear on this list because of the heavy use of proprietary components, particularly drivers and applications. 
There are numerous versions of Android which seek to replace the proprietary components, such as LineageOS (successor to the now-defunct Cyanogenmod) and Replicant, that can be installed on a large number of phones after-market. There are  also devices using Ubuntu Touch and Droidian which are using GNU/Linux and Android hardware adaptation layer Halium. Phones natively running these are included.
There are multiple projects to implement mainline Linux on mobile phones. Mobian is an open-source project focusing on Debian GNU/Linux on mobile devices. postmarketOS is based on the Alpine Linux. Arch Linux ARM based Manjaro is focusing on PinePhone hardware.
WebOS was initially available only under a proprietary license but the source code was later released under a free permissive license by HP. Open WebOS will not run on all WebOS devices. LuneOS is Halium based fork of WebOS.
Firefox OS was released under a permissive MIT license but its KaiOS successor is proprietary; the former is included.
All Maemo, Meego and Sailfish OS devices running open Maemo Leste or Mer middleware are included. Tizen devices are not included.
Open QTMoko/OpenMoko phones of Qt Extended are included to the list.

Note that it is often possible to install a wide variety of open-source operating systems on any open-source phone; the higher-level software is designed to be largely interchangeable and independent of the hardware.

Devices with formal support

Devices with 3rd party support

Distributions for existing phones

postmarketOS, Ubports, and KDE Neon are open-source distributions running on existing smartphones originally running Android. Maemo Leste is available for Nokia N900 and Motorola Droid 4.

There exists a database listing which older phones will run which open-source operating systems.

Custom-made phones

It is possible to home-build a phone from partially open hardware and software. The Arduinophone (touchscreen) and the MIT DIY Cellphone (segmented display) both use the Arduino open-hardware single-board computer, with added components. Circuitmess Ringo (previously MakerPhone) is another DIY Arduino phone with open source firmware and available schematics, focusing on education. The PiPhone and ZeroPhone are similar, but based on the Raspberry Pi.

The main components to make an open mobile phone are: 
 Back cover
 Touch screen
 Battery
 Logic board

See also

 List of open-source hardware projects
 Comparison of open-source mobile phones (features)
 Mobile operating system (categorized by license)
 Mobile device (mobile platform)
 OsmocomBB
 Blackphone
Fairphone
Tor Phone

References

Mobile Linux
Mobile phone standards
Lists of computer hardware
Open-source mobile phones